Stuart Hooper (born 18 November 1981) is the current director of rugby and former rugby union player, at Bath Rugby. He last played for Bath Rugby in the Aviva Premiership in April 2016.

Early life
Born in Exeter, Hooper played basketball at county level until he was 16, before opting for rugby on his move to the specialist sports campus at Ivybridge Community College.

Career

Saracens: 1999-2003
Hooper broke into the Saracens team whilst still a teenager and played alongside Frenchman Abdel Benazzi in the second row.

Leeds: 2003-2007
After making over 30 appearances or so for Saracens he made a surprise move to Leeds Tykes in June 2003. He made his Tykes debut against Bath on 14 September 2003. During his time at Leeds he helped them win the 2004–05 Powergen Cup, where he started in the final.

In June 2005 Hooper was called up for England Saxons against France and was part of their Churchill Cup success in Canada. Hooper captained the 2009 Saxons side in the Churchill Cup.

Hooper was appointed as captain of Leeds Tykes for the 2005–06 Guinness Premiership season, and in doing so became the youngest captain in the league.

Bath Rugby: 2007-2016
In April 2006, Hooper re-signed with Leeds, but left at the end of the 2007–08 season to join Bath. On 5 July 2011 Hooper was named the new Bath club captain for the 2011–12 season.

Hooper retired with immediate effect from all rugby under medical advice on 14 April 2016 as the result of a back injury. On 30 August 2016 it was announced the Hooper would take on the role of Performance and Player Development Director at Bath.
On 7 May 2019 it was announced that Hooper would take on the role of Director of Rugby for Bath at the start of the 2019/20 season, following the departure of former director of rugby Todd Blackadder. He will become General Manager ahead of the 2022–23 season.

Honours
Powergen Cup/Anglo-Welsh Cup titles: 1
2005

References

External links
Bath profile
Leeds profile
England profile
Interview in the Independent
Yorkshire Evening Post interview

1981 births
Living people
Bath Rugby players
English rugby union players
Leeds Tykes players
Rugby union locks
Rugby union players from Exeter
Saracens F.C. players